Pioner may refer to:
Pioner, a former urban-type settlement in Kemerovo Oblast, Russia; since 2004—a part of the city of Kemerovo
Pioner, Penza Oblast, a village (selo) in Penza Oblast, Russia
Pioner, Republic of Bashkortostan, a village in the Republic of Bashkortostan, Russia
Pioner, name of several other rural localities in Russia
RSD-10 Pioneer, a Soviet medium-range ballistic missile